Markus Babbel (born 8 September 1972) is a German professional football coach and former player who last managed the Western Sydney Wanderers FC. He played as a defender for clubs in Germany and England. Babbel won the UEFA Cup twice, in 1996 with Bayern and in 2001 with Liverpool, and was part of the Germany team that won UEFA Euro 96.

Career

Playing career

Bayern Munich
Born in Munich, Babbel's first professional club was Bayern Munich. He advanced from the youth squad to the first team and was a starting player eight times, and made four appearances as a substitute in league games.

Hamburger SV and return to Bayern Munich
He moved to Hamburger SV in August 1992 and appeared regularly in the first team, scoring his first league goal in Germany's top-flight. Returning to Bayern Munich in 1994, he started in 167 games, and attracted the attention of Manchester United following UEFA Euro 1996. A£5 million deal was put in place for the German full back, but it never went through. He was signed on a Bosman by Liverpool F.C. manager Gérard Houllier in June 2000, forming part of the back four during Liverpool's successful 2000–01 season.

Liverpool
He was an integral member of Liverpool's side and his characteristic raiding runs down the right side led to a number of goals, including one in the UEFA Cup final itself. His Liverpool career was forced to a sudden halt when he contracted Guillain–Barré syndrome and was unable to play for a year.

Blackburn Rovers
He went on loan to Blackburn Rovers in August 2003 after having recovered from Guillain–Barré syndrome, achieving regular first team appearances in the league and scoring three goals in the process.

VfB Stuttgart

Babbel's last club was VfB Stuttgart, which he joined on a free transfer in July 2004.

In January 2007, Babbel announced that he would retire at the end of the 2006–07 season.

German National Team 
He was capped 51 times, scoring one goal for Germany and was part of the Euro 96 winning team. Babbel also played for his country at the 1998 FIFA World Cup and Euro 2000.

Coaching career

2007–12: Early career

Following his retirement from football, Babbel stayed on with his last club, VfB Stuttgart, as an assistant manager.

On 24 November 2008, Babbel became head coach of VfB Stuttgart. Upon Babbel's arrival, VfB Stuttgart were 11th in the table after 14 games. Babbel's first match was a 1–1 draw against Sampdoria on 27 November 2008. They finished the season in third place, five points off league winners VfL Wolfsburg and qualifying for the Champions League. On 6 May 2009, Babbel extended his contract with VfB Stuttgart until the summer of 2011, however, on 6 December 2009 VfB Stuttgart and Babbel parted ways. His final match was a 1–1 draw against VfL Bochum on 5 December 2009. At the time of Babbel's sacking, VfB Stuttgart were in 16th place after 15 games played. Babbel finished with a record of 21 wins, 15 draws, and 14 losses. Under Babbel, VfB Stuttgart finished second in their Champions League group and qualified for the round of 16.

Babbel took over Hertha BSC in the 2nd division in July 2010. His first match was a 2–0 German Cup win. In his first season, he succeeded in returning them to the Bundesliga after winning the 2. Bundesliga during the 2010–11 season. On 18 December 2011, Babbel was sacked as coach of Hertha BSC. Prior to this, he had announced that he wanted to leave the club at the end of the season. His final match was a 1–1 draw against 1899 Hoffenheim on 17 December 2011. Hertha BSC were in 11th place at the time of the sacking. Babbel finished with a record of 30 wins, 13 draws, and 12 losses.

On 10 February 2012, Babbel took over as manager of 1899 Hoffenheim. 1899 Hoffenheim were in eighth place when Babbel took over. His first match was a 1–1 draw against Werder Bremen. 1899 Hoffenheim finished the season in 11th place. On 3 December 2012 he was released because of poor results, with the team in 16th place in the Bundesliga. Babbel's final match was a 4–1 loss to Werder Bremen. Babbel finished with a record of seven wins, eight draws, and 15 losses.

2014–2018: FC Luzern
Babbel became the new head coach of Luzern on 12 October 2014, following the sacking of Carlos Bernegger who failed to win a single league game in 2014–15 season. His first match was a 0–0 draw against Vaduz on 19 October 2014. Luzern finished the 2014–15 season in fifth place.

The 2015–16 season started off with a 2–2 draw against Sion on 18 July 2015. During the 2015–16 season, Luzern got to semi-final of the Swiss Cup and finished 3rd in the league.

The 2016–17 season starts with six matches between 23 July 2016 and 7 August 2016. Luzern won the opening match of the season 2–1 against Lugano on 23 July 2016.

2018: Western Sydney Wanderers
On 19 May 2018, Babbel was appointed as manager of Western Sydney Wanderers FC in the A-League. The 2018–19 A-League season saw the Wanderers finish eighth out of ten teams, winning only six games, drawing six and losing 15. In the 2019–20 season, after a bright start including a 1–0 win over Sydney FC in the first Sydney Derby at the new Western Sydney Stadium, the team collapsed with just 1 win and only 2 draws in the next 11 games, dropping from first place after 3 rounds to 9th place (out of 11) after 14 matches. Babbel was sacked by the Wanderers on Monday, 20 January 2020 with his assistant coach named as interim replacement.

Overview

Career statistics

International
Score and result list Germany's goal tally first, score column indicates score after Babbel goal.

Managerial statistics

Honours

As a player

Bayern Munich
 Bundesliga: 1996–97, 1998–99, 1999–2000
 DFB-Pokal: 1997–98, 1999–00, Runner-up 1998–99
 DFB-Ligapokal: 1997, 1998, 1999
 UEFA Cup: 1995–96
 UEFA Champions League: Runner-up 1998–99

Liverpool
 FA Cup: 2000–01
 League Cup: 2000–01
 FA Community Shield: 2001; runner-up 2002
 UEFA Cup: 2000–01
 UEFA Super Cup: 2001

VfB Stuttgart
 Bundesliga: 2006–07
 DFB-Pokal: Runner-up 2006–07
 DFB-Ligapokal: Runner-up 2005

International
 UEFA European Championship: 1996

As a coach

Hertha BSC
 2. Bundesliga: 2010–11

References

External links
 
 
 
 

1972 births
Footballers from Munich
German footballers
Bundesliga players
Premier League players
Association football fullbacks
German expatriate footballers
Expatriate footballers in England
Germany international footballers
Germany under-21 international footballers
FC Bayern Munich footballers
FC Bayern Munich II players
Hamburger SV players
Liverpool F.C. players
Blackburn Rovers F.C. players
VfB Stuttgart players
UEFA Euro 1996 players
1998 FIFA World Cup players
UEFA Euro 2000 players
UEFA European Championship-winning players
German football managers
Bundesliga managers
VfB Stuttgart managers
Hertha BSC managers
TSG 1899 Hoffenheim managers
Living people
Expatriate football managers in Switzerland
German expatriate football managers
FC Luzern managers
German expatriate sportspeople in England
German expatriate sportspeople in Switzerland
UEFA Cup winning players
FA Cup Final players
People with Guillain–Barré syndrome
West German footballers